Not So Dusty may refer to:

 Not So Dusty (1936 film), a British comedy film starring Wally Patch
 Not So Dusty (1956 film), a British comedy film starring Bill Owen
 Not So Dusty (album), an Australian tribute album